"Skip to My (The) Lou" is a popular American partner-stealing dance from the 1840s.

Poet and Abraham Lincoln biographer Carl Sandburg writes that "Skip-to-my-Lou" was a popular party game in US President Abraham Lincoln's youth in southern Indiana, with verses such as "Hurry up slow poke, do oh do", "I'll get her back in spite of you", "Gone again, what shall I do", and "I'll get another girl sweeter than you".

John A. and Alan Lomax wrote that "Skip to My Lou" was a simple game of stealing partners (or swapping partners as in square dancing). It begins with any number of couples skipping hand in hand around in a ring. A lone boy in the center of the moving circle of couples sings, "Lost my partner, what'll I do?" as the girls whirl past him. The young man in the center hesitates while he decides which girl to choose, singing, "I'll get another one just like you." When he grasps the hand of his chosen one, the latter's partner moves to the center of the ring. It is an ice-breaker, providing an opportunity for the participants to get acquainted with one another and to get into a good mood. "Skip to My Lou" is no. 3593 in the Roud Folk Song Index.

S. Frederick Starr suggests that the song may be derived from the Creole folksong "Lolotte Pov'piti Lolotte", to which it has a strong resemblance.

The "lou" in the title comes from the word "loo", a Scottish word for "love".

Uses
"Skip to My Lou" was featured in the 1944 film Meet Me in St. Louis. Sections of the song arranged by Hugh Martin and Ralph Blane are sung to the tunes of "Kingdom Coming" and "Yankee Doodle".  In the 1951 film Across the Wide Missouri it is sung by Clark Gable (while playing a Jew's-Harp) and others throughout the movie. In the classic Western The Searchers (1956), Ken Curtis uses the song to serenade Vera Miles.

The song has been recorded by various artists including Lead Belly, Pete Seeger, Judy Garland, Nat King Cole, The Blue Sky Boys, Dickie Bishop and His Sidekicks, and Dale Warland Singers, among others. The song remains a favorite piece performed by various classic choirs with a popular arrangement by Paul Busselberg.

The song has been adapted to dancehall by various Jamaican artists. In 2009, it was released by QQ featuring Ding Dong in a College Boiz Productions release. In 2010, the Jamaican dancehall artist Serani released another version of the song under the title "Skip to My Luu" featuring Ding Dong, and a second version that in addition to Ding Dong also included Raz n Biggy with additional lyrics. In 2011, RDX released a dancehall reggae adaptation titled "Skip".

In the Thomas & Friends fourth series episode Peter Sam & The Refreshment Lady, Peter Sam sings "I'm Peter Sam I'm running this line" which has a similar melody.

Lyrics

Common version
Skip, skip, skip to my Lou,
Skip, skip, skip to my Lou,
Skip, skip, skip to my Lou,
Skip to my Lou, my darlin'.

(Changing verse here) (3x)
Skip to my Lou, my darlin'.

Lou, Lou skip to my lou (x3)
Skip to my Lou my darlin'

The changing verse:
Fly in the buttermilk, shoo, fly, shoo.
There's a little red wagon, paint it blue.
I lost my partner, what'll I do?
I'll get another, as pretty as you
Can't get a red bird, jay bird'll do.
Cat's in the cream jar, ooh, ooh, ooh.
Off to Texas, two by two.

Another version
Fly in the buttermilk, Shoo, shoo, shoo! (3x)
Skip to my Lou, my darling! (repeat 1x)
Lou, Lou skip to my Lou! (3x)
Skip to my Lou, my darling.

Cows in the pasture two by two! (3x)
Skip to my Lou, my darling! (repeat 1x)
Lou, Lou skip to my Lou, (3x)
Skip to my Lou, my darling.

(sound sad) Lost my partner, What'll I do? (3x)
Skip to my Lou, my darling! (repeat 1x)
Lou, Lou skip to my Lou, (3x)
Skip to my Lou, my darling.

(sound happy) I'll find another one better than you! (3x)
Skip to my Lou, my darling!

Found my partner love is true! (3x)
Skip to my Lou, my darling!
Lou, Lou skip to my Lou! (3x)
Skip to my Lou, my darling.

References

American folk songs
American children's songs
Traditional children's songs
Singing games
Lead Belly songs
1840s songs